FCCA may refer to:

 Chartered Certified Accountant, postnominal initials
 Federal Circuit Court of Australia
 Federal Communications Commission Act, otherwise known as the Communications Act of 1934
 Ferrocarril Central Andino, a railway company in Peru
 Ferrocarril Central Argentino, a former railway company in Argentina 
 Film Critics Circle of Australia